Juliana's is a pizzeria located in Brooklyn, New York. Founded in 2012 by Pasquale "Patsy" Grimaldi and named after his mother, in 2015 it was rated the best pizzeria in the United States on TripAdvisor. Along with cannoli and egg cream seltzer drinks, the restaurant is known for its "classic margherita" pizza with San Marzano tomatoes, mozzarella, and basil.

History

Backstory and founding (1925-2012)
Pasquale "Patsy" Lancieri founded a bakery in East Harlem in 1925. He converted the bakery to a pizzeria in 1933 and named it Patsy's Pizzeria, hiring his namesake nephew Pasquale "Patsy" Grimaldi as a cook. Following in his uncle's footsteps, Grimaldi opened Grimaldi's Pizzeria on Old Fulton Street in 1990. The building has a history dating back to the 18th century, originally built as a tavern and later owned by Dipoline Manufacturing Company before becoming a pizzeria. In 1998, Grimaldi retired and sold the Grimaldi's brand name and franchise to Frank Ciolli. Several years later, Ciolli moved Grimaldi's Pizzeria to a larger building next door. In 2011, Grimaldi announced he was coming out of retirement at the age of 80, but was unable to open a restaurant in his own name due to selling his brand rights.

In 2012, he opened Juliana's, named after his mother Maria "Juliana" Lancieri Grimaldi, in Grimaldi's former location, starting a rivalry between the two. According to AMNY, the rivalry is "playful." The original opening, slated for March 2012, was delayed due to lawsuits with Grimaldi's, and the final opening was in December 2012. Without serving pizza by the slice, only the pie, Juliana's menu included "food from the Grimaldi's youth: pizza made with fresh mozzarella in a coal-fired oven; seltzer from glass bottles and egg creams made with U-Bet chocolate syrup. Pre-pandemic, they sold about 40 egg creams a week to customers of all ages, many of them curious tourists."

Reception in Brooklyn (2013-2017)
In 2015, TripAdvisor named Juliana's the "#1 pizzeria in the United States." In late 2016, Zagat named the restaurant the best place in New York City to get pizza, with Business Insider describing the staple food item as "coal-fired pies in simple, classic varieties, including margherita topped with tomato, mozzarella, and basil, and white pizza smothered in mozzerella and garlic." It was rated the best pizzeria in New York by Zagat's in 2017. In 2017, New York Magazine named its cannoli the second-best in New York City, after Villabate Alba. About Juliana's, the magazine wrote that "served with a (traditional) spoon and a garnish of adorable rainbow sprinkles, these cannoli brighten up the area’s permafrost of tourist gridlock, and even add irresistible levity to the block’s fabled and protracted pizza wars." Also that year, New York Magazine named the restaurant's egg creams "the absolute best" in the city.

Recent (2018-2022)
In January 2020, Juliana’s threatened legal action against another restaurant named Juliana’s Pizzeria in West Hartford, Connecticut, forcing the restaurant to change its name to Bert’s Pizza.

Menu and restaurant
At 19 Old Fulton Street in DUMBO, Brooklyn, the restaurant is located close to the Brooklyn Bridge, with views of Manhattan Island.

The menu in 2021 included appetizers, pizzas, white pizzas, calzone, spaghetti and meatballs, and desserts such as New York cheesecake, cannoli, and local ice cream among others. Drinks include egg cream, espresso, cappuccino, seltzer from the Brooklyn Seltzer Boys company, beer on tap and by bottle, and wine by the glass and bottle. The company also partially cooks pizzas for "take and bake." According to ABC and CNN, the restaurant's "signature" pizza is the "classic margherita" with San Marzano tomatoes, mozzarella, and basil.

See also
 List of Italian restaurants
 List of restaurants in New York City

References

External links
 

Italian restaurants in New York City
Italian-American culture in New York City
Pizzerias in New York City
Restaurants in Brooklyn
Restaurants established in 2012
2012 establishments in New York City